B.B.D Bag railway station is a Kolkata Suburban Railway station in BBD Bagh. It serves the local areas of BBD Bagh and Fairly Place in the Kolkata, West Bengal, India. This is a very important station and is mostly used by office goers. The station has two platforms. Its station code is BBDB.

Station complex
The platform is very much well sheltered. The station has many facilities including water and sanitation. It is well connected to the Strand Road.

Station layout

Connections

Bus 
From Fairlie Place – Bus route number C, 12A, 12AD, 12C, 12C/1, 12C/1A, 12C/1B, 12C/2, 13, 13A, 17, 17B, 18A, 18A/1, 18D, 24A, 24A/1, 37, 37A, 39, 41, 41B, 52, 54, 55, 55A, 57, 59, 73, 75 (Esplanade to Kadamtala), 205, 208, 212, 214, 259, 1 (Mini), 1A (Mini), 2 (Mini), 3 (Mini), 3A (Mini), 6 (Mini), 6A (Mini), 8 (Mini), 10 (Mini), 11 (Mini), 11A (Mini), 18 (Mini), 21 (Mini), 26 (Mini), 27 (Mini), 27A (Mini), 30 (Mini), 31 (Mini), 32 (Mini), 38 (Mini), 39 (Mini), S101 (Mini), S101/1 (Mini), S102 (Mini), S103 (Mini),  S104 (Mini), S105 (Mini), S106 (Mini), S107 (Mini), S107/1 (Mini), S108 (Mini), S108/1 (Mini), S108/2 (Mini), S109 (Mini), S110 (Mini), S111 (Mini), S112 (Mini), S113 (Mini), S116 (Mini), S117 (Mini), S118 (Mini), S119 (Mini), S119/1 (Mini), S120 (Mini), S121 (Mini), S122 (Mini), S123 (Mini), S124 (Mini), S125 (Mini), S126 (Mini), S128 (Mini), S129 (Mini), S135 (Mini), S151 (Mini), S152 (Mini), S158 (Mini), S159 (Mini), S163 (Mini), S164 (Mini), S165 (Mini), S166 (Mini), S167 (Mini), S171 (Mini), S173 (Mini), S175 (Mini), S181 (Mini), S184 (Mini), M14 (Mini), C7, C11, C24, C26, C28, C37, C38, C42, C44, D7/1, E1, E4, E47, EB24, M7B, M7C, M7E, MIDI1, 7A, S2, S3A, S3B, S4C, S5, S5C, S6A, S7, S10A, S12, S12D, S24, S47, S47A, T2, T8, T12, AC1, AC4, AC5, AC6, AC12, AC12D, AC20, AC24, AC39, AC52 serve the station.

Metro 
Mahakaran metro station (under construction) is located nearby.

Air

See also

References

External links
 

Sealdah railway division
Railway stations in Kolkata
Transport in Kolkata
Kolkata Suburban Railway stations
Kolkata Circular Railway